Anne-Marie Lemieux  (born ) is a retired Canadian female volleyball player, who played as a setter.

She was part of the Canada women's national volleyball team at the 2002 FIVB Volleyball Women's World Championship in Germany.

References

External links

1976 births
Living people
Canadian women's volleyball players
Place of birth missing (living people)
Setters (volleyball)